Allen Jerome Morgan (July 16, 1925 – September 12, 2011) was an American rowing coxswain who competed in the 1948 Summer Olympics.

Born in Seattle, Washington, he coxed the American boat that won the gold medal in the coxed four event in 1948.

External links

Allen Jerome Morgan's obituary

1925 births
2011 deaths
Coxswains (rowing)
Rowers at the 1948 Summer Olympics
Olympic gold medalists for the United States in rowing
American male rowers
Medalists at the 1948 Summer Olympics